The 1929–30 season was the 57th season of competitive football in Scotland and the 40th season of the Scottish Football League.

Scottish League Division One 

Champions: Rangers
Relegated: Dundee United, St Johnstone

Scottish League Division Two 

Promoted: Leith Athletic, East Fife

Scottish Cup 

Division One champions Rangers were winners of the Scottish Cup after a 2–1 replay win over Partick Thistle.

Other honours

National

County

Highland League

Junior Cup 
Newtongrange Star were winners of the Junior Cup after a 3–0 win over Hall Russell in the final.

Scotland national team 

Key:
 (H) = Home match
 (A) = Away match
 BHC = British Home Championship

References

External links 
 Scottish Football Historical Archive